Wally Kirika (born October 27, 1982) is a sprinter from Kainantu, Papua New Guinea.

He began sprinting at Kainantu High School. As a junior athlete, he was one of four male sprinters selected by the Papua New Guinea Athletic Union to take part in the Melanesian Championships in Fiji in April 2001. He reached the second round in the 100m at the 2006 Commonwealth Games with a then-personal best of 10.76s. His time of 10.80s in the second round was the best of the three Pacific Islanders in the second round. His personal bests, both set in 2007, are 10.74s in the 100m and 22.01s in the 200m.

As of 2010 he was a winger with the Hornibrook NGI Harlequins rugby team.

Achievements

References

External links
 

1982 births
Living people
Athletes (track and field) at the 2006 Commonwealth Games
Papua New Guinean male sprinters
People from the Eastern Highlands Province
Commonwealth Games competitors for Papua New Guinea
World Athletics Championships athletes for Papua New Guinea